The Kentucky Bourbon Festival is a weeklong activity consisting of more than thirty events in Bardstown, Kentucky, United States, dedicated to celebrating the history and art of distilling bourbon whiskey. The organizers of the festival promote the strong association between bourbon and the city of Bardstown, and have trademarked the phrase "Bourbon Capital of the World" to apply specifically to Bardstown.  Bardstown has been the site of bourbon distilleries since 1776.

The event started in 1992 as a dinner and bourbon tasting for 250 people.  The event now draws more than 50,000 visitors each year from more than a dozen countries including Japan and the U.K. The festival also is almost always a sold-out event, with over 10,000 tickets available and sold between both distilleries and attendees. This makes it one of Kentucky's largest events. 

Along with concerts with names like the Kentucky Headhunters, several local distilleries have commemorative displays on the lawn, as well as food and craft vendors.  The event is home to the world championship bourbon barrel relay, a barrel rolling race between many of the Kentucky distilleries.  On the property of Spalding Hall, the Oscar Getz Museum of Whiskey is often visited during the festival.

Along with these activities includes tasting events, cooking demonstrations, competitions, and historic tours on bourbon and Kentucky. 

Before 2021, the festival was open to anyone, kids and adults, alike. But, in 2021, some things were changed. It is now only a 21+ event. The Kentucky Bourbon Festival states that their festival has been "reimagined" for this. This is a new change made to the festival, as children and families won't be able to get in. 

The festival moved online in 2020 as the physical part was scrapped on grounds of COVID-19 pandemic.

The festival, since 2021, has been moved back to an in-person event in its original place of Bardstown, Kentucky.

See also
American Whiskey Trail
Kentucky Bourbon Trail
List of attractions and events in the Louisville metropolitan area
Whiskey
Oscar Getz Museum of Whiskey History

References

External links
Kentucky Bourbon Festival website
"Washington Post article on the Kentucky Bourbon Festival"

Bardstown, Kentucky
Festivals in Kentucky
Events in Louisville, Kentucky
Festivals established in 1992
Tourist attractions in Nelson County, Kentucky
1992 establishments in Kentucky
September events
Bourbon whiskey